Baral is a surname found in people from Bangladesh, India, Nepal, as well as a small number of Jews from Poland and Austria.

Notable people
Akshay Kumar Baral (1860–1918), Bengali poet and writer
Anup Baral (born 1968), Nepali actor, writer, and film director
Bahadur Singh Baral (1892–1962), Nepali British Army soldier and national poet
Babu Baral (1964–2011), Pakistani stage actor and comedian
Babul Supriya Baral (born 1970), Bengali-Indian singer and politician
Happy Baral (born 1968), Bengali politician
Khadga Jeet Baral Magar ( 20th-cent.), Nepali folk singer
Khadgajeet Baral (1928–2021), Nepali politician and social worker
Krishnahari Baral (born 1954), Nepali lyricist, songwriter, poet, literary critic, author, and professor
Mohan Baral (born 1972), Nepali singer, actor, and politician
Sudarshan Baral (born ?), Nepali politician
 Rai Chandra Baral (born 1903), Indian music director and composer

See also
Boral (surname), a similarly spelled surname

Bengali-language surnames
Indian surnames
Nepali-language surnames